Karia is a census town in Bagnan I CD Block in Uluberia subdivision of Howrah district in the state of West Bengal, India.

References

Cities and towns in Howrah district